The Pwo Karen language is one of the main groups of the Karen languages, alongside the S'gaw Karen language and Pa'O. The Pwo Karen language contains four different dialects, which are at best marginally mutually intelligible:

 Eastern Pwo (code: kjp)
 Western Pwo (code: pwo)
 Northern Pwo (code: pww)
 Phrae Pwo (code: kjt)

The people who speak the language are referred to by many names, notably "Pwo Karen" or simply "Karen". The people call themselves Ploan Sho. The Pwo Karen people have lived in the eastern part of Burma for centuries, and in the western and northern parts of Thailand for at least seven or eight centuries. The population of “Pwo karen” is 1,525,300 in Myanmar.

The endonym is Phlou  or Ka Phlou , meaning "human beings".

References

Dawkins, Erin and Audra Phillips. 2009. A sociolinguistic survey of Pwo Karen in Northern Thailand'. Chiang Mai: Payap University.
Phillips, Audra. 2009. Lexical Similarity in Pwo Karen. In PYU Working Papers in Linguistics 5, Audra Phillips (ed.). Chiang Mai, Thailand: Payap University Linguistics Department.
Kato, Atsuhiko. 2009. A basic vocabulary of Htoklibang Pwo Karen with Hpa-an, Kyonbyaw, and Proto-Pwo Karen forms. Asian and African Languages and Linguistics 4:169-218.

Karenic languages